Water quality modeling involves water quality based data using mathematical simulation techniques. Water quality modeling helps people understand the eminence of water quality issues and models provide evidence for policy makers to make decisions in order to properly mitigate water. Water quality modeling also helps determine correlations to constituent sources and water quality along with identifying information gaps. Due to the increase in freshwater usage among people, water quality modeling is especially relevant both in a local level and global level. In order to understand and predict the changes over time in water scarcity, climate change, and the economic factor of water resources, water quality models would need sufficient data by including water bodies from both local and global levels.

A typical water quality model consists of a collection of formulations representing physical mechanisms that determine position and momentum of pollutants in a water body. Models are available for individual components of the hydrological system such as surface runoff; there also exist basin wide models addressing hydrologic transport and for ocean and estuarine applications. Often finite difference methods are used to analyze these phenomena, and, almost always, large complex computer models are required.

Building A Model 
Water quality models have different information, but generally have the same purpose, which is to provide evidentiary support of water issues. Models can be either deterministic or statistical depending on the scale with the base model, which is dependent on  if the area is on a local, regional, or a global scale. Another aspect to consider for a model is what needs to be understood or predicted about that research area along with setting up any parameters to define the research. Another aspect of building a water quality model is knowing the audience and the exact purpose for presenting data like to enhance water quality management for water quality law makers for the best possible outcomes.

Formulations and  associated Constants

Water quality is modeled by one or more of the following formulations 
 Advective Transport formulation
 Dispersive Transport formulation
 Surface Heat Budget formulation
 Dissolved Oxygen Saturation formulation
 Reaeration formulation
 Carbonaceous Deoxygenation formulation
 Nitrogenous Biochemical Oxygen Demand formulation
 Sediment oxygen demand formulation (SOD)
 Photosynthesis and Respiration formulation
 pH and Alkalinity formulation
 Nutrients formulation (fertilizers)
 Algae formulation
 Zooplankton formulation
 Coliform bacteria formulation (e.g. Escherichia coli )

SPARROW Models 
A SPARROW model is a SPAtially-Referenced Regression on Watershed attributes, which helps integrate water quality data with landscape information. More specifically the USGS used this model to display long-term changes within watersheds to further explain in-stream water measurement in relation to upstream sources, water quality, and watershed properties. These models predict data for various spatial scales and integrate streamflow data with water quality at numerous locations across the US. A SPARROW model used by the USGS focused on the nutrients in the Nation's major rivers and estuaries; this model helped create a better understanding of where nutrients come from, where they are transported to while in the water bodies, and where they end up (reservoirs, other estuaries, etc.).

See also

 Hydrological transport models
 Stochastic Empirical Loading and Dilution Model
 Storm Water Management Model
 Volumes of water on earth
 Water resources
 Water quality
 Wastewater quality indicators
 Streeter-Phelps equation
 PCLake

References

 U.S. Environmental Protection Agency (EPA). Environmental Research Laboratory, Athens, GA (1985). "Rates, Constants and Kinetics Formulations in Surface Water Quality Modeling." 2nd ed. Document no. EPA/600/3-85/040.

External links
 SPARROW Water-Quality Modeling - US Geological Survey- US Geological Survey
 BASINS - EPA environmental analysis system integrating GIS, national watershed data, environmental assessment and modeling tools
 Water Quality Models and Tools - EPA
 Models for Total Maximum Daily Load Studies - Washington State Department of Ecology
 Catchment Modelling Toolkit - eWater Cooperative Research Centre, Australia
 Water Evaluation And Planning (WEAP), an integrated water resources planning model, including water quality - Stockholm Environmental Institute (US)
 Stochastic Empirical Loading and Dilution Model (SELDM) - US Geological Survey stormwater quality model 
 U.S. Army Corps of Engineers Water Quality - New water quality modeling software developed by the U.S. Army Corps of Engineers

Environmental science
Ecological experiments
Aquatic ecology
Chemical oceanography
Environmental engineering
Quality